Jude Jacob Soonsup-Bell (born 10 January 2004) is an English footballer who plays as a striker for Premier League club Tottenham Hotspur.

Early life
Born in Chippenham, Soonsup-Bell started his career at local side FC Calne, before joining Swindon Town. He moved to Chelsea at under-13 level.

In an interview Jude recalls “always being in love with the sport”. He grew up idolising Portuguese legend Cristiano Ronaldo, and states him as an influence on his style of play.

Jude’s surname, Soonsup (ซุ่นทรัพย์), comes from his maternal grandfather, who is Thai. His maternal grandmother is of English and Welsh descent. His Father, Michael Bell, is of English and Irish descent.

Club career
Initially a midfielder, Soonsup-Bell was converted into a forward in the Chelsea academy. This change was beneficial for both Chelsea and Soonsup-Bell, as he progressed into a prolific striker, notably scoring four goals in an 8–1 FA Youth Cup win over Barnsley - the first Chelsea player to score four goals in this competition since Roger Bill in 1961.

At the age of 16, he was playing regularly for Chelsea's under-23 squad, and was seen as one of Chelsea's best young players. He signed his first professional contract in January 2021, having trained with the first team in preparation for their FA Cup third round tie with Morecambe.

Soonsup-Bell made his Chelsea debut on 22 December 2021 in the quarterfinals of the EFL Cup, starting in a 2–0 win against Brentford.  On 30 January 2023, it was confirmed that Soonsup-Bell had signed a contract with Tottenham Hotspur.

International career
Eligible to represent both England and Thailand, through his Thai Grandfather, Soonsup-Bell has played for England at under-15, under-16, under-18 and under-19 level. He is the second highest goal-scorer for the England U16s, behind Jadon Sancho, with six goals in seven appearances.

Career statistics

Club

Notes

References

2004 births
Living people
People from Chippenham
English people of Thai descent
English footballers
England youth international footballers
Jude Soonsup-Bell
Association football forwards
Swindon Town F.C. players
Chelsea F.C. players
Tottenham Hotspur F.C. players